Archibald Ladley Linn (October 15, 1802 – October 10, 1857) was a U.S. Representative from New York.

Early life
Linn was born in New York City on October 15, 1802. He was the son of Rev. William Adolphus Linn (1752–1808) and Helena (née Low) Hansen (1760–1837).  His mother was first married to Dirck Hansen (1743–1799), a Captain in the Revolutionary War with whom she had at least seven children before his death.  His parents married in 1800 and his father, William was the 1st Chaplain of the United States House of Representatives and the 2nd President of Queen's College (now Rutgers University), in 1800.

His mother was the granddaughter of Cornelis Cuyler, the 20th Mayor of Albany and son of Johannes Cuyler, and Catharina Schuyler, herself the daughter of Johannes Schuyler and the niece of Pieter and Arent Schuyler, all of the prominent Schuyler family.  His great-grandmother was also the sister of Johannes Schuyler Jr. and the aunt of Gen. Philip Schuyler.

Career
Linn was a member of the class of 1820 at Union College, Schenectady, New York.  He studied law, was admitted to the bar and commenced practice in Schenectady.  He served as county judge of Schenectady County from January 17, 1840, to February 9, 1845.

Linn was elected as a Whig to the Twenty-seventh Congress, serving from March 4, 1841 to March 3, 1843.  He served as chairman of the Committee on Public Expenditures (Twenty-seventh Congress).

Following his service in the United States House of Representatives, he served for year as a member of the New York State Assembly from January 1 to December 31, 1844.

Personal life
Linn was married to Mary Ten Eyck McClelland (1808–1896). Mary was the daughter of William McClelland (1768–1812) and Ann Ten Eyck McClelland (1774–1813).  Her mother was the widow of Barent Ten Eyck (1766–1796) of the prominent Ten Eyck family, before she married her father, William.  Together, they were the parents of:

 William Linn (1826–1844)
 Peter Van R. Linn (1828–1901)
 John Blair Linn (1830–1901), a Reverend who married Mary Morgan (1835–1892).
 Charles F. Linn (1833–1841), who died young.
 Mary H. Linn (1835–1925), who married James Hastings (1835–1914) in 1871.
 Archibald Linn (1839–1864)
 Charles Franchot Linn (1841–1923), who married Rachel Fuller Linn (1848–1928).
 Helen Lowe Linn (1843–1923)
 Jeannette Linn (1845–1861)

He died in Schenectady, New York, October 10, 1857. He was interred at the Albany Rural Cemetery in Menands, New York.

Sources

External links

}

1802 births
1857 deaths
American people of Dutch descent
Schuyler family
Union College (New York) alumni
Politicians from Schenectady, New York
New York (state) state court judges
New York (state) lawyers
Members of the New York State Assembly
Whig Party members of the United States House of Representatives from New York (state)
19th-century American politicians